Hinduism is a minority religion and a fairly recent development in Lithuania. Hinduism is spread in Lithuania by Hindu organizations: ISKCON, Sathya Sai Baba, Brahma Kumaris and Osho Rajneesh. As of 2015, there were 580 (0.02%) Hindus in Lithuania.

ISKCON (Krišnos sąmonės judėjimas) the largest movement and oldest movement as the first Krishna followers date to 1979. and has three centres in Lithuania in Vilnius, Klaipėda and Kaunas.

Brahma Kumaris maintains the Centre Brahma Kumaris in Antakalnis, Vilnius.

Demographics

According to a census in 2001, 265 people identified themselves as followers of Hare Krishna movement, 107 identified as Shri Sathya Sai Baba followers, and 12 identified as Osho Rajneesh movement.

According to 2011 census, there are 344 Krishnaites in Lithuania.

Lithuanian Hindus
 Ieva Zasimauskaitė, singer and contestant at Eurovision Song Contest 2018

See also
Hinduism by country
Religion in Lithuania

References